Deerfield Township is a township in Warren County, Pennsylvania, United States. The population was 270 at the 2020 census, down from 339 at the 2010 census.

Geography

Demographics

As of the census of 2000, there were 333 people, 156 households, and 102 families residing in the township.  The population density was 7.8 people per square mile (3.0/km2).  There were 647 housing units at an average density of 15.1/sq mi (5.8/km2).  The racial makeup of the township was 99.70% White, and 0.30% from two or more races.

There were 156 households, out of which 19.9% had children under the age of 18 living with them, 59.6% were married couples living together, 2.6% had a female householder with no husband present, and 34.6% were non-families. For Deerfield Township, 32.1% of all households were made up of individuals, and 15.4% had someone living alone who was 65 years of age or older.  The average household size was 2.13 and the average family size was 2.70.

In the township the population was spread out, with 16.2% under the age of 18, 3.6% from 18 to 24, 22.5% from 25 to 44, 36.0% from 45 to 64, and 21.6% who were 65 years of age or older.  The median age was 50 years. For every 100 females, there were 119.1 males.  For every 100 females age 18 and over, there were 126.8 males.

The median income for a household in the township was $30,781, and the median income for a family was $45,313. Males had a median income of $27,212 versus $21,042 for females. The per capita income for the township was $22,217.  About 4.0% of families and 4.9% of the population were below the poverty line, including none of those under age 18 and 5.7% of those age 65 or over.

References

Townships in Warren County, Pennsylvania
Townships in Pennsylvania